The Montreux Document is an agreement between signature countries obligations regarding private military and security companies in war zones. It was ratified in Montreux, Switzerland, in September 2008. The document lists some 70 recommendations for good state practices such as verifying companies track record, examining procedures used to vet staff, correct prosecution when breaches of law occur, and ensure compliance and personnel training with international humanitarian and human rights law.

Its full name is 'The Montreux Document on Pertinent International Legal Obligations and Good Practices for States related to Operations of Private Military and Security Companies during Armed Conflict of 17 September 2008'.  It provides contracting states, home states, and territorial states, with a restatement of their international legal obligations and a series of ‘good practices’ to use in interacting with the industry.

Several provisions also provide legal obligations incumbent on private security companies themselves. Importantly, the focus of the document is primarily on times of armed conflict – but the principles are expressly relevant to non-armed conflict situations as well. It is a non-binding, non-legal document in that it neither creates nor alters legal obligations, but merely articulates existing requirements pertinent to private security operations.

Elements of the Montreux Document have been incorporated into the management system standards jointly authored and published by ANSI/ASIS, such as PSC.1-2012 and PSC.4-2013.

Ratifying states

Original ratifiers of the agreement in 2008 were:
 
 
 
 
 
 
 
 
 
 
 
 
 
 
 
 
 

As of December 2018, 54 states had joined the Montreux Document.

References

External links
“The Montreux Document”
Agreements
Diplomatic conferences in Switzerland